Thistle Television was a locally broadcast commercial television station for Lanarkshire, Scotland. It broadcast a mixture of locally produced programmes and newer films. It also showed two hours' worth of Sky News every day as well as broadcasting the QVC channel.

It replaced the defunct Lanarkshire TV before closing itself.

Defunct television channels in Scotland
RSL television channels